Coluccio  is an Italian surname and given name. Notable people with the name include:

 Coluccio Salutati (1331 – 1406), Italian humanist
 Giuseppe Coluccio (born 1966), Italian gangster
 Bob Coluccio, (born 1951), baseball player

Italian-language surnames
Italian masculine given names